The 1944 United States presidential election in Maine took place on November 7, 1944, as part of the 1944 United States presidential election. State voters chose five electors to the Electoral College, which selected the president and vice president.

Maine was won by Republican Party candidate New York governor Thomas E. Dewey over Democratic candidate, incumbent President Franklin D. Roosevelt.

Dewey won Maine by a narrow margin of 4.99%.

Along with Vermont, Maine is one of two states that never aggregately voted for President Franklin D. Roosevelt in any of his four victorious presidential campaigns.

Results

Results by county

See also
 United States presidential elections in Maine

References

1944
Maine
1944 Maine elections